The River Braan is a tributary of the River Tay in Scotland. 
Within the county of Perth and Kinross, it flows 11 miles (17 km) eastwards from Loch Freuchie, near Amulree, and joins the River Tay near Dunkeld.

Etymology 

The name Braan is likely of Pritenic origin and derived from *breμ-, meaning "bellow, bray, roar" (Welsh brefu). A similar etymological root underlies the names of the rivers Breamish in Northumberland, England, and the Brefi in Ceredigion, Wales.

See also 
The Hermitage
Hermitage Bridge
Ossian's Hall of Mirrors
Black Linn Falls

References

Braan, River  - Geo.ed.ac.uk

External links
Guide to the River Braan - ukriversguidebook.co.uk
SCA opposes Braan hydro proposals
River Braan fishing beats - Fishingnet.com

Braan
1Braan